was a Japanese professional shogi player who achieved the rank of 9-dan.

As a child, he spent much of his time hospitalized due to nephrotic syndrome. He later acquired bladder cancer but focused on shogi rather than getting treatment.

The movie Satoshi: A Move for Tomorrow was based on Murayama's life as a shogi professional.

Nikaidō Harunobu from the manga series March Comes in like a Lion is a character modeled after Murayama.

References

External links
Japan Shogi Association official profile page 

Japanese shogi players
Deceased professional shogi players
Professional shogi players from Hiroshima Prefecture
1969 births
1998 deaths